Sean Allan Krill (born June 10, 1971) is an American actor and singer who has appeared in film and television, on Broadway, Off-Broadway, and at prestigious regional theaters across the country. Krill made his Broadway debut as Sam Carmichael in 2008 in Mamma Mia!. He originated the role of Steve Healy in the Alanis Morissette musical Jagged Little Pill for which he was nominated for the 2020 Tony Award for Best Featured Actor in a Musical, and the cast album of the critically-acclaimed show was the recipient of the 2020 Grammy Award for Best Musical Theater Album.

Life & Career
Sean Allan Krill was born on Altus Air Force Base in Oklahoma. His father, Allan Krill was a Master Sergeant in the United States Air Force. Krill lived in many different cities, but grew up predominantly in Shelby Township, a suburb of Detroit, Michigan. After watching a national tour performance of Les Misérables at The Fisher Theater, Krill was inspired to pursue a career in acting. Krill studied at Wayne State University, where he received the Lily Tomlin Scholarship for Theatre.

Theatre

Film & Television

Awards & Nominations

Personal life
After graduating from Wayne State University College of Fine, Performing, and Communication Arts, he moved to Chicago to open the original Chicago company of Forever Plaid in 1994, playing Sparky.  Krill lived and worked in Chicago for over 15 years, appearing in both plays and musicals at theaters throughout the city, including Royal George Theater, Marriott Theatre, Drury Lane Theatre, Court Theater, Chicago Theatre, Rosemont Horizon, Cadillac Palace Theatre, Nederlander Theatre, CIBC Theater, Chicago Shakespeare Theater, and Steppenwolf Theatre Company.

Krill's partner of 13 years, fellow actor Guy Adkins, died on May 12, 2010 after a 15 month bout with colon cancer. Krill and actor Harry Bouvy married in 2015, after bonding over the experience of losing their partners. Krill & Bouvy performed together in regional productions of Boeing-Boeing & White Christmas, and in Parade at New York City Center.

Krill lives in New York, New York.

References

External links 
Sean Allan Krill's website
 
 

Actors from Oklahoma
People from Jackson County, Oklahoma
1971 births
Living people
American male stage actors
American male television actors